Banjari is one of the popular Hindu deity in Odisha, India.  There are many Banjari temples present in the western and southern parts of Odisha.  The Banjari temple in Majursahi is well-recognized in Odisha. Banjari is also the primary deity associated with the Nial family of Majursahi in Majursahi. Magha Puja is one of the most popular festivals of Banjari at Majursahi. Chaitra is a festival associated with Banjari in Majursahi.

Brief history of Banjari

Banjari temples 
 Majursahi
 Junagarh
 Raipur

References 

Hindu temples in Odisha
Hindu gods